The Communist Party of Belgium (or PCB) is a communist party in Belgium. It was founded in Wallonia in 1989 as the Communist Party of Wallonia after the Communist Party of Belgium was bifurcated along linguistic lines, and refounded as the PCB following the extinction of its counterpart in Flanders. Pierre Beauvois was the  
General Secretary of the party to 2006.

PC publishes Le Drapeau Rouge and Mouvements. It was part of the Party of the European Left until July 2018.

References

External links
  

1989 establishments in Belgium
Communist parties in Belgium
Francophone political parties in Belgium
Party of the European Left former member parties
Political parties established in 1989
International Meeting of Communist and Workers Parties
Far-left political parties